The 1942–43 Duke Blue Devils men's basketball team represented Duke University during the 1942–43 men's college basketball season. The head coach was Gerry Gerard, coaching his first season with the Blue Devils. The team finished with an overall record of 20–6.

References 

Duke Blue Devils men's basketball seasons
Duke
1942 in sports in North Carolina
1943 in sports in North Carolina